James Fraser was a Scotland international rugby union player.

Rugby Union career

Amateur career

He played for Edinburgh Institution F.P.

International career

He was capped just the once for Scotland, in 1881.

Medical career

Fraser became a doctor. He became the first full time medical officer to the Hull Education Authority. He maintained that post till he retired in 1926.

Other interests

He was greatly interested in the Hull Subscription Library. He was also very involved with the youth of the city, and was a chairman of the local Young People's Institute.

Family

He was the eldest son of Evan Fraser (1826–1906), a Scottish doctor from Duddingston; and Sarah Hewat (born 1829) from Portobello.  Evan Fraser and Sarah Hewat moved to Hull shortly after their marriage in 1858 – and he became chairman of the Hull Health committee. The Evan Fraser hospital in Hull bore his name. The hospital specialised in infectious diseases; notably smallpox. James was one of five children the couple had.

James Fraser married Rose Thorney in 1883. Miss Thorney was the daughter of the Hull city coroner. They had a daughter, Dorothy, in 1885. James outlived his wife, who died in 1927, and his daughter, who died in 1941. He died in the Victoria Nursing Home in 1943, leaving £7,511 and 2 shillings in his estate.

References

1859 births
1943 deaths
Edinburgh Institution F.P. players
Rugby union players from Kingston upon Hull
Scotland international rugby union players
Scottish rugby union players
Rugby union forwards